The Ourcq (Urc in 855) is an  river in France, a right tributary of the Marne. Its source is near the village Ronchères, and its course crosses the departments of Aisne, Oise, and Seine-et-Marne. It flows southwest through the towns of Fère-en-Tardenois, La Ferté-Milon, Mareuil-sur-Ourcq, and Crouy-sur-Ourcq, finally flowing into the Marne near Lizy-sur-Ourcq. Napoleon I made use of the river as a water source, and it supplied the city of Paris until Baron Haussmann's rebuilding of Paris.

References

Rivers of France
Rivers of Île-de-France
Rivers of Hauts-de-France
Rivers of Aisne
Rivers of Oise
Rivers of Seine-et-Marne